Brownsover Hall is a 19th-century mansion house in the old village of Brownsover, Rugby, Warwickshire which has been converted for use as a hotel. It is a Grade II* listed building.

Early History (1471–1850)
The manor of Brownsover was owned from 1471 by the Boughton family who were created Boughton Baronets in 1642. In 1780 Sir Theodosius Boughton was allegedly murdered by his brother-in-law and the estate passed to his sister Theodosia, and thence to Sir Egerton Leigh, Bt, of the Leigh of West Hall family. Leigh's daughter and heiress, also Theodosia, married John Ward, who changed his name by Royal Licence to Ward-Boughton-Leigh.

Nineteenth century
In the mid 19th century the old manor house was replaced with the present mansion, designed in a Victorian Gothic style by architect Sir George Gilbert Scott. William Holland designed a stained glass window and carved tables as frames for Italian marble slabs. He is well known for establishing a Stained Glass and Decorative works at St. John's, Warwick. Other contributors to the new manor were Marshall and Snelgrove  of London, and Eld and Chamberlain, of Midland House, Birmingham relating to the carpets and furnishings that were chosen for the house.
  	
The Hall was the home of the Ward-Boughton-Leighs until the 1930s.

Twentieth century
The Brownsover estate was bought by and became the residence (1936–1942) of Sir Frank Whittle, credited with the invention of the jet engine.

After Whittle moved out, the hall became the temporary residence of Vernon Henry St John, 6th Viscount Bolingbroke, 7th Viscount St John.

The English Electric Company used the building from 1949 until the late 1960s where they housed the headquarters of their Diesel Division. It was in the 1970s when the Hall was converted into a hotel.

Brownsover Hall is now a 3-star hotel including 47 bedrooms, bar and "Wineglass" restaurant offering a "simple food, made special" seasonal menu. The hotel is set within 7-acres of landscaped grounds, with views over the Swift Valley nature reserve.

The hotel is a licensed property for civil ceremony weddings and plays host to many special events throughout the year.

References
  A History of the County of Warwick, Volume 6 (1951) pp. 65–72 from British History Online
  Heritage Gateway, listed building description Actually Located In The Old Village Of Brownsover, Just Aside The New Estate Of Brownsover (Not Clifton)

Notes

External links

   Hotel website 
 Cracroft's Peerage

Grade II* listed buildings in Warwickshire
George Gilbert Scott buildings
Country houses in Warwickshire
Grade II* listed houses
Buildings and structures in Rugby, Warwickshire